Fútbol Club Levante Las Planas (Catalan: Llevant Les Planes) is a Spanish football club from Sant Joan Despí, Barcelona currently playing in Liga F.

History
Levante Las Planas was founded in 1983 in Las Planas district as a merge of local teams UP Bética and Rayo Planense. The club is best known for its women's team, established in 1998. On the other hand, the male team plays in 7th-tier Tercera Catalana.

In 2012 Levante Las Planas was promoted to the Primera División for the first time after topping its Segunda División group and beating Fundación Albacete and UD Tacuense in the play-offs. In its debut season the team ended in the lower half of the table with a comfortable 16 points margin over relegation positions.

The club was promoted to the top division again on the final matchday of the 2021–22 season, beating direct rivals Espanyol (a fellow Catalan club and six-time Spanish champions) by a 3–0 scoreline.

Season to season (women)

Players

Current squad
.

Former internationals
  Mexico: Pamela Tajonar
  Spain: Alicia Fuentes

References

Women's football clubs in Spain
Association football clubs established in 1983
Football clubs in Catalonia
1983 establishments in Spain
Baix Llobregat
Segunda Federación (women) clubs
Primera División (women) clubs